Richard Anthony Wolf (born December 20, 1946) is an American film and television producer, best known for his Law & Order franchise. Since 1990, the franchise has included six police/courtroom dramas and four international spinoffs. He is also creator and executive producer of the Chicago franchise, which since 2012 has included four Chicago-based dramas, and the creator and executive producer of the FBI franchise, which since 2018 has also become a franchise after spinning off two additional series.

Wolf has also written four books. The first, the non-fiction volume Law & Order: Crime Scenes, is a companion to the Law & Order television series. The Intercept, The Execution, and The Ultimatum, all of which are works of fiction, are volumes in a thriller series upon whose writings Wolf collaborates with the NYPD's detective Jeremy Fisk.

Wolf has won numerous awards, including an Emmy Award, being inducted into the Television Academy Hall of Fame, and receiving a star on the Hollywood Walk of Fame.

Early life and education
Wolf was raised in Manhattan to a Jewish father and a Catholic mother of Irish descent. He was an altar boy.

Wolf attended Saint David's School, The Gunnery, and Phillips Academy. He subsequently attended the University of Pennsylvania (class of 1969), where he was a member of the Zeta Psi fraternity.

Career

Advertising
Wolf worked as an advertising copywriter at Benton & Bowles creating commercials for Crest toothpaste, including the slogan "You can't beat Crest for fighting cavities." He is also credited with the campaign "I'm Cheryl, fly me" for National Airlines. Yet despite his success in copywriting, all the while he was writing screenplays in the hopes of a film career. It was at this time that he briefly collaborated on a screenplay with Oliver Stone, who was a struggling screenwriter at the time.

Initial screenwriting success
He moved to Los Angeles after a few years and had three screenplays produced; one of these films, Masquerade (1988), starring Rob Lowe and Meg Tilly, was well received. He started his television career as a staff writer on Hill Street Blues and was nominated for his first Emmy Award for the episode "What Are Friends For?", on which he was the only writer. While working on Hill Street Blues, Wolf became close friends with Tom Fontana, then writing for the series St. Elsewhere, produced in the same building, at the same time. Wolf moved from Hill Street Blues to Miami Vice, where he was a writer and co-producer for the third and fourth seasons.

Law & Order franchise

Wolf's original series Law & Order ran from 1990 to 2010, and was revived in 2022. It tied (and later passed) Gunsmoke for the then-longest-running dramatic show in television history, making it one of television's most successful franchises. It has been nominated for the most consecutive Emmy Awards of any primetime drama series. Wolf serves as creator and executive producer of the current Law & Order drama series from Wolf Entertainment and NBC Universal Television – Law & Order: Special Victims Unit (which as of 21 June 2021 is the longest-running scripted primetime drama, having aired 494 episodes, breaking the original Law & Order count of 456 (now 466 through the twenty-first season), and beating both the original Law & Order and Gunsmoke in number of seasons).  Wolf also was creator and executive producer for the four spinoff shows in the franchise that have been canceled – Law & Order: Criminal Intent, Law & Order: Trial by Jury, Law & Order: UK, and Law & Order: Los Angeles. Along with Kevin Arkadie, he co-created the police drama New York Undercover, which ran on the Fox Broadcasting Company Network from 1994 to 1999. He also served as executive producer of the series. He was the creator and executive producer of NBC's courtroom reality series Crime & Punishment, which chronicled real-life cases prosecuted by the San Diego District Attorney's office. Many of Wolf's series have intersected with the Law & Order franchise in some fashion, and the Law & Order series have been adapted into several foreign versions. Wolf's company also produced Twin Towers, the 2003 Academy Award–winning Short Documentary about two brothers, one a policeman and the other a fireman, who were killed in the line of duty on September 11, 2001. Wolf was also involved with When You're Strange, the production of a theatrical documentary about the rock band The Doors.

Organized Crime 
On March 31, 2020, Wolf announced that the spin-off series has ordered for NBC to launch in the 2020–21 television, with Christopher Meloni reprising his role as Elliot Stabler, who left SVU nine years earlier. The series began with 13 episodes. On June 2, 2020, it was announced that the series would be called Law & Order: Organized Crime and that its showrunner Craig Gore had been fired.

Hate Crimes 
Wolf announced that NBC placed an order of 13 episodes for Law & Order: Hate Crimes, a new installment of the franchise. However, March 4, 2019, NBC announced that the series would be heading back into redevelopment to flesh out the concept and such introduction on SVU would not take place. On June 5, 2020, the series of Hate Crimes was moved to NBC's streaming service, Peacock, at least partly due to language concerns.

For the Defense 
On May 3, 2021, Wolf announced that NBC ordered yet another installment of the franchise, Law & Order: For the Defense, and that its showrunner would be Carol Mendelsohn. However, it was later announced that the show would not move forward.

Chicago franchise

Wolf developed Chicago Fire, a drama about a group of men and women working at the Chicago Fire Department. The series was picked up by NBC in May 2012, and premiered on October 10, 2012, with meek numbers in the ratings and minimal reviews in the first few weeks before spiking to NBC's #2 scripted drama series, under Revolution. In March 2013, NBC announced intentions for a spin-off of Chicago Fire revolving around the Chicago Police Department. When that series Chicago P.D. premiered, Derek Haas, Michael W. Brandt, and Matt Olmstead became executive producers, under Wolf. Two subsequent shows, Chicago Med which premiered in 2015, and Chicago Justice whose one season began and ended in 2017, followed in Chicago P.D.'s wake.

FBI franchise 

In 2018, Wolf became executive producer of the CBS drama FBI, starring Law & Order cast members Jeremy Sisto and Alana de la Garza and also Sela Ward. FBI has since had two spinoffs (FBI: Most Wanted, and FBI: International), giving Wolf his third franchise.

Beginning in the 2021-2022 TV season, all three of Wolf's franchises have their own night of programming: FBI Tuesdays on CBS (original series, Most Wanted, International), Chicago Wednesdays on NBC (Med, Fire, P.D.), and Law & Order Thursdays on NBC (original series revival, SVU and Organized Crime).

Other work
In 2012, Wolf developed the unscripted show Cold Justice, a documentary drama, for TNT. He also has written three novels whose central character is NYPD Detective Jeremy Fisk: The Intercept, The Execution, and The Ultimatum.

Future projects
Wolf's future projects for NBC are an American adaption of the United Kingdom psychological legal drama series Injustice as well as a drama series revolving around a satanic cult, tentatively titled The Church. Wolf is writing the latter project with Howard Franklin. Wolf also has an untitled pilot about an insurance investigator on USA Network.

With Wolf pursuing projects other than Law & Order, he and current Law & Order: Special Victims Unit showrunner/executive producer Warren Leight sometimes discuss the future of the Law & Order franchise and revitalizing it; Leight commenting "(Dick Wolf and I) sometimes talk in general terms of where (the franchise) could go. I'm curious to see if there's another iteration somewhere down the line."

In May 2021, NBC ordered a docuseries LA Fire and Rescue. The series will follow the firefighters of the Los Angeles County Fire Department and will be executive produced by Wolf.

Honors
Wolf's personal honors include the Award of Excellence from the Banff Television Festival, the 2002 Creative Achievement Award from NATPE; the Anti-Defamation League's Distinguished Entertainment Industry Award, the Leadership and Inspiration Award from the Entertainment Industries Council, the Governor's Award by the New York Chapter of the National Academy of Television Arts and Sciences, the 1997 achievement award from the Caucus for Producers, Writers, and Directors, the 1998 Television Showman of the Year Award from the Publicists Guild of America, the 2002 Tribute from the Museum of Television and Radio, and a 2003 Special Edgar Award from the Mystery Writers of America. On March 29, 2007, Wolf received a star on the Hollywood Walk of Fame at 7040 Hollywood Boulevard. In 2013 Wolf was inducted into the Television Academy Hall of Fame. Wolf is also an Honorary Consul general of Monaco and is actively involved in the principality's prestigious annual Television Festival, and as its primary liaison with the entertainment community.

Political involvement
It was reported that Wolf contributed to Fred Thompson's campaign for the Republican nomination for president in 2008. The two had worked together since 2002, when Thompson joined the cast of Law & Order playing a district attorney.

In popular culture 
Community, a sitcom on NBC from 2009 to 2014 had an episode which parodied Dick Wolf's Law & Order, with the title "Basic Lupine Urology" being a play on his name. Wolf is given a special thanks credit at the end of the episode.

Filmography

Film 
 Skateboard (1978)
 No Man's Land (1987)
 Masquerade (1988)
 School Ties (1992)
 Twin Towers (2003)
 Bury My Heart at Wounded Knee (2007)
 Naked Singularity (2021)
 77 (TBA)

Television

Scripted

Unscripted

Animated 
 Fatherhood (2004–2005)
 Family Guy (2012); Guest voice in "Ratings Guy"

Foreign 
 Paris enquêtes criminelles (2007–2008)

Thanks 
 Community ("Basic Lupine Urology", 2012)

References

External links
 
 Interview with Wolf on NPR's Fresh Air (March 11, 2005)
 Behind the Scenes of Dick Wolf's Nasty Boys
 
 New York Times article: "Dick Wolf Breaks and Enters with 'Law and Order' on NBC" by Bruce Weber, March 1, 1992.

1946 births
Living people
Writers from New York City
American people of Irish descent
American male screenwriters
American television producers
Television producers from New York City
American television writers
Edgar Award winners
Emmy Award winners
The Frederick Gunn School alumni
Phillips Academy alumni
University of Pennsylvania alumni
Place of birth missing (living people)
Showrunners
International Emmy Founders Award winners
American male television writers
American people of Jewish descent
Law & Order (franchise)
Chicago (franchise)
Screenwriters from New York (state)